"Saturday Adoption" is the second television play episode of the second season of the American television series CBS Playhouse. The episode tells the story of a young white man about to enter law school who meets a young black man, Macy, when he volunteers to tutor urban youths. The episode discusses the issues surrounding the differences between the black and white worlds of the time.

The episode was broadcast in December 1968, and is noteworthy as the CBS Playhouse entry with the youngest writer, Ron Cowen, at 23 years of age.

References

External links 
 
 Discard Treasures: Early TV Drop-outs.

1968 American television episodes
1968 plays
CBS Playhouse episodes